Andrew Swallow (born 2 June 1987) is a former professional Australian rules footballer who played for the North Melbourne Football Club in the Australian Football League (AFL). He was the captain of North Melbourne from 2012 to 2016 before retiring in 2017.

AFL career

Recruitment
He was North Melbourne's third round draft selection in the 2005 AFL Draft, number 43 overall, from the [East Fremantle football club] in the WAFL.

2006 (Debut)
He received a nomination for the NAB Rising Star for his performance against Geelong in Round 17, 2006 when he managed 28 possessions and a goal.

2007
Swallow's form improved during the 2007 season, consistently gaining high numbers of disposals each week. This culminated in the spectacular 1-point win over Melbourne in Round 9 in which he scored the winning goal.

2008
Swallow played the first 3 games in 2008, before being sent back to the VFL to work on his outside run and spread from the stoppages. After some positives performances at North Ballarat Roosters, he injured his ankle during a game and missed 7 weeks.

2009 (Syd Barker Medallist)
But he was back to his best in 2009 returning to the side to be one of North's finest throughout the season. His disposal has notably improved, and he has worked on all aspects of his game to play every game, and is now recognised as one of the best tacklers and clearance players in the North Melbourne side, and the AFL. On 2 October 2009, Swallow was awarded the Syd Barker Medal by North Melbourne for being the club's best and fairest player for the year.

2010
He had another terrific season in 2010 playing all 22 games for the second consecutive season and finishing just one vote behind Brent Harvey and Brady Rawlings for the Syd Barker Medal.

2011
In 2011, he would have arguably his best season to date again playing every game and taking home his second Syd Barker Medal which he shared with Daniel Wells. He would also be one of four North Melbourne players selected in the 40 man All Australian squad however he missed out on being selected in the final 22. He would however be selected as part of Australian squad for the International Rules series against Ireland.

2012
In February 2012, Swallow was announced captain of North Melbourne Football Club replacing Brent Harvey. As a captain, Andrew Swallow capped off a fantastic year to win the Syd Barker Medal with 60 votes becoming a three time Syd Barker Medalist.

2016
In December 2016 it was announced that Jack Ziebell would take over the captaincy role at North Melbourne.

2017
By the conclusion of the 2017 season, Andrew Swallow announced his retirement from AFL

Statistics
 Statistics are correct to the end of round 9, 2016

|- style="background-color: #EAEAEA"
! scope="row" style="text-align:center" | 2006
|style="text-align:center;"|
| 19 || 12 || 2 || 5 || 87 || 63 || 150 || 34 || 45 || 0.2 || 0.4 || 7.3 || 5.3 || 12.5 || 2.8 || 3.8
|-
! scope="row" style="text-align:center" | 2007
|style="text-align:center;"|
| 19 || 25 || 10 || 4 || 169 || 198 || 367 || 74 || 128 || 0.4 || 0.2 || 6.8 || 7.9 || 14.7 || 3.0 || 5.1
|- style="background-color: #EAEAEA"
! scope="row" style="text-align:center" | 2008
|style="text-align:center;"|
| 19 || 3 || 0 || 0 || 18 || 23 || 41 || 6 || 14 || 0.0 || 0.0 || 6.0 || 7.7 || 13.7 || 2.0 || 4.7
|-
! scope="row" style="text-align:center" | 2009
|style="text-align:center;"|
| 9 || 22 || 17 || 8 || 187 || 224 || 411 || 85 || 152 || 0.8 || 0.4 || 8.5 || 10.2 || 18.7 || 3.9 || 6.9
|- style="background-color: #EAEAEA"
! scope="row" style="text-align:center" | 2010
|style="text-align:center;"|
| 9 || 22 || 16 || 11 || 206 || 261 || 467 || 68 || 183 || 0.7 || 0.5 || 9.4 || 11.9 || 21.2 || 3.1 || 8.3
|-
! scope="row" style="text-align:center" | 2011
|style="text-align:center;"|
| 9 || 22 || 11 || 7 || 268 || 294 || 562 || 69 || 145 || 0.5 || 0.3 || 12.2 || 13.4 || 25.5 || 3.1 || 6.6
|- style="background-color: #EAEAEA"
! scope="row" style="text-align:center" | 2012
|style="text-align:center;"|
| 9 || 23 || 9 || 12 || 278 || 316 || 594 || 74 || 164 || 0.4 || 0.5 || 12.1 || 13.7 || 25.8 || 3.2 || 7.1
|-
! scope="row" style="text-align:center" | 2013
|style="text-align:center;"|
| 9 || 17 || 2 || 8 || 210 || 194 || 404 || 56 || 107 || 0.1 || 0.5 || 12.4 || 11.4 || 23.8 || 3.3 || 6.3
|- style="background-color: #EAEAEA"
! scope="row" style="text-align:center" | 2014
|style="text-align:center;"|
| 9 || 18 || 5 || 6 || 195 || 200 || 395 || 54 || 107 || 0.3 || 0.3 || 10.8 || 11.1 || 21.9 || 3.0 || 5.9
|-
! scope="row" style="text-align:center" | 2015
|style="text-align:center;"|
| 9 || 22 || 4 || 3 || 219 || 260 || 479 || 43 || 164|| 0.2 || 0.1 || 10.0 || 11.8 || 21.8 || 2.0 || 7.5
|- style="background-color: #EAEAEA"
! scope="row" style="text-align:center" | 2016
|style="text-align:center;"|
| 9 || 9 || 0 || 2 || 77 || 99 || 176 || 16 || 75 || 0.0 || 0.2 || 8.6 || 11.0 || 19.6 || 1.8 || 8.3
|- class="sortbottom"
! colspan=3| Career
! 195
! 76
! 66
! 1914
! 2132
! 4046
! 579
! 1284
! 0.4
! 0.3
! 9.8
! 10.9
! 20.7
! 3.0
! 6.6
|}

Personal life
Swallow is the older brother of Gold Coast Suns midfielder David Swallow, who was taken at pick #1 in the 2010 AFL Draft. Swallow was born and raised in Western Australia attending Rehoboth Christian College. Swallow is a Christian.

References

External links

 
 
 

1987 births
North Melbourne Football Club players
East Fremantle Football Club players
Syd Barker Medal winners
Australian rules footballers from Western Australia
Living people
Australian Christians
North Ballarat Football Club players
Australia international rules football team players
Aspley Football Club players
Werribee Football Club players